Julie is a 1975 Indian romantic drama film directed by K. S. Sethumadhavan and written by Chakrapani. The film stars Lakshmi in the title role (in her Hindi debut). It also stars Vikram, Nadira, Rita Bhaduri,  Om Prakash, Utpal Dutt and  Sridevi (in her first significant Hindi role). The film was a critical and commercial success. Despite the film's success, Lakshmi felt comfortable in choosing to do movies majorly down South. Julie was also a musical blockbuster with critics alike and with award-winning music by Rajesh Roshan, which won him the Filmfare Award for the year. It had one of the first English language songs in an Indian film - "My Heart is Beating", sung by Preeti Sagar. It's a rare Hindi film that features an Anglo-Indian family in the lead. It is a remake of a Malayalam blockbuster film Chattakari (1974), which also starred Laxmi as the female lead making her Malayalam & Hindi debuts in both versions respectively. She would star in yet another remake, the Telugu film Miss Julie Prema Katha (1975). She didn't act in the Kannada remake, Julie, released in 2006, which had Ramya in the title role as Julie and Dino Morea as the leading man.  She also declined the role of Julie's mother in the Malayalam remake titled Chattakari (2012), stating that she wanted the audiences to remember her as the young and beautiful Julie; the title role went to Shamna Kasim. Actress Urvashi portrayed the role of Julie in its Tamil remake Oh Maane Maane (1984). The remake and adaptation rights of this film are now owned by Glamour Eyes Films.

Plot
This film depicts the restrictive social conventions regarding inter-religion marriage and unwed motherhood in India. Julie (Lakshmi) is a Christian Anglo-Indian girl with a loving, but alcoholic father (Om Prakash), a dominating mother (Nadira), a younger brother and sister (Sridevi). She falls in love with her best friend, Usha Bhattacharya's (Rita Bhaduri) brother Shashi Bhattacharya (Vikram Makandar), a Hindu boy. The lovers consummate their relationship, which leaves her pregnant. Shashi goes away to college, not knowing about her pregnancy. Her mother is distraught when Julie tells her about the pregnancy. They don't tell the rest of the family. Her mother thinks about getting Julie an abortion, but a devout Christian (Sulochana) talks her out of it. Julie is sent away to have her baby in secret. The rest of the family is told that Julie got a job. After the baby's birth, Julie's mother arranges for the child to be left in an orphanage, and demands that Julie return home and forget about the baby.

When Julie returns home, her father has died. She is now the primary earner in the family. Later, she runs into Shashi and tells him everything. He then asks to marry her, but his mother objects to the marriage as Julie is of a different faith. She blames Julie for seducing her son and having the baby. Julie's mother doesn't want the union either, as it will be an inter-faith marriage, and she wants to return to England. However, the wisdom of Shashi's father (Utpal Dutt) prevails as he confronts the mothers' prejudices regarding caste and religion, and urges them both to accept their grandchild. The film ends with the mothers offering their full blessings to the young couple, and Julie's mother promising her grandson she will "never leave him."

Cast
 Lakshmi as Julie
 Vikram Makandar as Shashi Bhattacharya
 Nadira as Margaret "Maggie", Julie's mother
 Om Prakash as Morris, Julie's father
 Rita Bhaduri as Usha Bhattacharya
 Utpal Dutt as Mr. Bhattacharya, Usha and Shashi's father
 Sridevi as Irene, Julie's younger sister
 Sulochana as Ruby Aunty
 Jalal Agha as Richard "Richie"
 Rajendra Nath as Rahim, Store Owner

Music
The film's soundtrack won Rajesh Roshan his first Filmfare Award, for Filmfare Award for Best Music Director. Julie was one of the top three best-selling soundtrack albums of 1975, along with Sholay and Sanyasi. A remixed cover version of "Dil Kya Kare" sung by Shaan appeared in the 1996 album Dance Masti.

Awards and nominations

References

External links

Films scored by Rajesh Roshan
Films based on Indian novels
Indian teen romance films
Indian interfaith romance films
Hindi remakes of Malayalam films
Films directed by K. S. Sethumadhavan
Teenage pregnancy in film
1970s Hindi-language films
1975 romantic drama films
Indian romantic drama films
1975 films